Major General Ian Cardozo AVSM SM is a former Indian Army officer. He was the first war-disabled officer of the Indian Army to command a battalion and a brigade. He is an amputee due to a war injury.

Early life
Ian Cardozo was born to Vincent Cardozo and Diana (née de Souza) Cardozo in 1937 in Bombay, Bombay Presidency, British India. He studied at St. Xavier's High School, Fort and St. Xavier's College, Mumbai.

Military career
Cardozo graduated from the National Defence Academy and then attended the Indian Military Academy, from where he joined the 5 Gorkha Rifles (Frontier Force) and he was commissioned & later commanded the 1st Battalion of the 5th Regiment of Gorkha RIfles aka 1/5GR(FF) or  1/5 Gorkha Rifles.
He has also served with 4/ 5 Gorkha Rifles and has fought 2 wars alongside them-Indo-Pakistani War of 1965 and the Indo-Pakistani War of 1971. He is the first NDA cadet to receive both Gold and Silver medals. The gold medal is given to the cadet of the passing out course for best all round performance.

The silver medal is given to the cadet who is first in order of merit. For the first time in the history of the National Defence Academy, the cadet who was awarded the gold medal was also first in order of merit. This has happened only one more time thereafter.(source :General himself and from his profile)

Pakistani-Bangladesh War of 1971
At the outbreak of the Pakistani-Bangladesh War of 1971, Cardozo was attending a course at the Defence Services Staff College, Wellington. His battalion, 4/5 Gorkha Rifles, was already deployed in the eastern theatre of operations. The battalion's second-in-command was killed in action and Cardozo was ordered to replace him. He arrived at his battalion in time to accompany them on the Indian Army's first heliborne operation during the battle of Sylhet. He was popularly named Cartoos sahib by his Gorkha regiment as they found it difficult to pronounce his first name. Cartoos means a cartridge in Hindi.

After the fall of Dhaka, Cardozo stepped on a land mine and his leg was critically injured. Due to non-availability of morphine or pethidine, and absence of medics, his leg could not be amputated surgically. He subsequently used his khukri to amputate his own leg. Afterwards, his unit captured a Pakistan Army surgeon, Maj. Mohammad Basheer, who operated on Cardozo.

Later career
After his amputation, Cardozo had a wooden leg. Despite this, he maintained his physical fitness levels and beat a number of able-bodied officers in battle physical fitness tests. He then put his case to the Chief of Army Staff at the time, Gen. Tapishwar Narain Raina, who then asked Cardozo to accompany him to Ladakh. After observing that Cardozo could still walk in the mountains through snow and ice, Gen. Raina allowed him to command a battalion. A similar situation occurred when he was to take command of a brigade. He was promoted to Brigadier on 1 March 1984.

Military awards and decorations

Personal life 
Cardozo is married to Priscilla and has three sons. He currently resides in New Delhi.

He served as the Chairman of Rehabilitation Council of India from 2005 to 2011. He is also a marathon runner, and regularly takes part in the Mumbai marathon on his prosthetic limb.

Bibliography
He authored several books on military history of India:-

 Bhartiya Sena Ka Gauravshali Itihas 
 India in World War I: An Illustrated Story 
 Lieutenant General Bilimoria: His Life & Times
 Param Vir: Our Heroes in Battle 
 Paramvir Chakra : Manojpandey 
 Somnath Sharma: Hero of the Battle of Badgam in 1947 who Helped Prevent the Fall of Srinagar 
 Shaitan Singh: Incredible Heroism Displayed by a Small Group Against Hordes of Chinese in the Battle of Rezang La in 1962 
 The Bravest of the Brave: The Extraordinary Story of Indian VCs of World War I 
 The Indian Army: A Brief History 
 The Sinking of INS Khukri: Survivor's Stories 
 1971 - Stories of Grit and Glory from the Indo-Pak War

See also
F. N. Billimoria
Yogendra Singh Yadav
Zorawar Chand Bakhshi

References

External links 
 Forty Years After: General Cardozo's incredible story

Indian generals
Indian amputees
Indian military personnel of the Indo-Pakistani War of 1971
Indian disability rights activists
1937 births
Indian military historians
Living people
Recipients of the Ati Vishisht Seva Medal
Indian Military Academy alumni